Armani/Silos is a fashion art museum in Milan dedicated to the Armani style. The opening exhibition was divided into themes:

 Ground floor: "Heimat: A Sense of Belonging", the dedicated to Peter Lindbergh (until August 2021)
 First floor: Androgynous
 Second floor: Ethnicities
Third floor: Stars / Digital archive

See also
 List of museums in Milan

References

Buildings and structures in Milan
Fashion museums in Italy
Tourist attractions in Milan
Armani